"Pipe Dreams" is a song recorded by Canadian singer and songwriter Nelly Furtado. It was released on December 20, 2016 as the lead single for her sixth studio album, The Ride (2017). The single was produced by John Congleton.

Composition 
"Pipe Dreams" is described as a mid-tempo, gospel-tinged R&B song. It closes with an organ solo. According to Furtado, the single talks about the false hope of dreaming. The single has a theme of a fantasy world. Furtado said about the lyrical content:

Music video 
The music video for "Pipe Dreams" was released on December 20, 2016. It is filmed through a VHS lens.

Release history

References 

2016 singles
2016 songs
Nelly Furtado songs
Song recordings produced by John Congleton
Songs written by John Congleton
Songs written by Nelly Furtado